Paul Robert Cheesman (May 31, 1921 – November 13, 1991) was an American archeologist and a professor of religion at Brigham Young University (BYU).

Biography
Cheesman was born in Brigham City, Utah and was a member of the Church of Jesus Christ of Latter-day Saints (LDS Church).  His parents died while he was still young and he oversaw his own education.  He received a degree in education from San Diego State University.  In California, he was also a public school teacher, and he later worked as a seminary teacher for the LDS Church.  During the Korean War, he served as a chaplain in the United States military.  In 1944, he married Millie Foster, with whom he had six children.

Later, as president of the Foster Corporation, Cheesman was heavily involved in Central America, where he developed a collection and strong interest in pre-Columbian archaeology.

Cheesman taught in BYU's Department of Religious Education from 1963 to 1986.  He received his master's degree in 1965 and doctorate in 1967, both in Religious Education at BYU.  For a time, he served as director of scripture studies and director of Book of Mormon studies in BYU's Religious Studies Center.  Cheesman was known for research of correlations between the Book of Mormon and pre-Columbian American discoveries.  His stated desire was to promote Latter-day Saint faith:Archaeological evidences which support The Book of Mormon do not convert, but we would hope that these thought-provoking discoveries might inspire and excite the reader to the point where they would want to study The Book of Mormon with real intent and gain a testimony of its truth.
After retiring, Cheesman and his wife moved to St. George, Utah.

Cheesman served in various callings in the LDS Church.  He served as a Bishop, District president, twice as Stake president, and as president of the Louisiana Baton Rouge Mission from 1980 to 1983.  After retiring from BYU, he was director of the church's New York Visitors Center.  In New York, Cheesman suffered a massive heart attack and returned to Utah for surgery, when he died in 1991.

Criticism
Cheesman's book Ancient American Indians: Their Origins, Civilizations and Old World Connections has been criticized as a poor work of scholarship, most especially by such men as Martin H. Raish and John L. Sorenson who also believe that the Book of Mormon is an ancient work and thus feel that such shoddy scholarship hurts more than it helps a true understanding of the book.  William J. Hamblin has said of a 1985 work by Cheesman on ancient writing on gold plates that it should be "used with caution".

Publications
Cheesman's most recognized publications are about ancient America's relationship to the Book of Mormon.  His master's thesis was notable for bringing to light the previously unknown 1832 account of the First Vision, Joseph Smith's first recorded account that dates to 1832.

Illustrated books

Notes

External links 
 
 The Paul R. Cheesman Collection, L. Tom Perry Special Collections. Harold B. Lee Library, Brigham Young University

1921 births
1991 deaths
20th-century Mormon missionaries
American military chaplains
American Latter Day Saint writers
American military personnel of the Korean War
American Mormon missionaries in the United States
Brigham Young University alumni
Brigham Young University faculty
Historians of the Latter Day Saint movement
Korean War chaplains
Mission presidents (LDS Church)
Mormon studies scholars
People from Brigham City, Utah
People from St. George, Utah
San Diego State University alumni
American leaders of the Church of Jesus Christ of Latter-day Saints
20th-century American writers
Latter Day Saints from Utah
Latter Day Saints from California
20th-century American archaeologists
Book of Mormon scholars